Bohemiclavulus is a genus of synapsids that was discovered in the Slaný Formation in the Czech Republic. It is only known from a single spinous process fragment.

History
Antonin Fritsch originally named Bohemiclavulus with the binomial Naosaurus mirabilis. It was renamed Ianthasaurus mirabilis in 1895 and was renamed to Edaphosaurus mirabilis later that year. In 2019, a new genus was created for the species.

See also
 List of pelycosaurs

References

Edaphosaurids
Prehistoric synapsid genera
Fossil taxa described in 2019